If You Came Back to Me is a 1954 Mexican drama film directed by Alfredo B. Crevenna and starring Libertad Lamarque, Silvia Pinal, Miguel Torruco and Maricruz Olivier.

Plot
Alejandra (Libertad Lamarque) is married to doctor Pedro (Miguel Torruco) and they have a daughter, Eva (Maricruz Olivier). When Eva is a young woman, she travels with her mother to the capital to meet Pedro, where they discover that he has set up a luxury hospital alongside a partner, Lidia (Silvia Pinal). Alejandra realizes that Lidia has stolen her husband's love and is doing the same with her daughter, whom she tries to convince to kill her own mother.

Cast
 Libertad Lamarque as Alejandra
 Silvia Pinal as Lidia Kane
 Miguel Torruco as Pedro Cuenca
 Maricruz Olivier as Eva
 Arturo Soto Rangel as Alejandra's Father
 Manuel Dondé
 Agata Rosenow
 Eduardo Acuña
 María Herrero
 Guillermina Téllez Girón	
 Victorio Blanco (uncredited)
 Fernando Casanova as Fabián Altamirano (uncredited)
 Martha Mijares as Student (uncredited)
 Juan Pulido as Doctor (uncredited)
 Enedina Díaz de León as Old Woman (uncredited)

References

External links
 

1954 drama films
1954 films
Mexican drama films
Films directed by Alfredo B. Crevenna
Films scored by Manuel Esperón
Mexican black-and-white films
1950s Mexican films